Aimée Rene Horne (born 11 May 1985) is an Australian actress, singer and voice-over artist. She has worked in film, theatre, radio and television and is an established voice-over artist. She is a graduate of the National Institute of Dramatic Art (NIDA).

Biography

Horne is best known for an epic seven month Australian tour of ‘Fawlty Towers Live’ playing ‘Polly’, directed by John Cleese and CJay Ranger

Horne has starred in productions for the Sydney Theatre Company (STC), Griffin Theatre and the ABC, as well as touring nationally for Company B (Belvoir) and Arts Radar. Aimee received a Sydney Theatre Award nomination for her role in the Tamarama Rock Surfers (TRS) production of The Highway Crossing.

Horne has receive great critical acclaim, such as "the standout was definitely Aimee Horne as the Client, delivering a blistering performance that seemed just as intense in seething silence as when mid-monologue" from Jack Teiwes in 2008 for her performance in the stage play "In the Solitude of Cotton Fields"

Film and Stage

References

External links
 Gallipoli Article in ABC News

1985 births
Living people
Australian stage actresses
Actresses from Adelaide
People from Broken Hill, New South Wales
Actresses from Sydney
Flinders University alumni
National Institute of Dramatic Art alumni
21st-century Australian actresses
21st-century Australian singers
21st-century Australian women singers